Joseph Johnson Hutcheson (February 5, 1905 in Springtown, Texas – February 23, 1993 in Tyler, Texas), was a former professional baseball player who played outfield for the 1933 Brooklyn Dodgers. He attended the University of North Texas.

External links

1905 births
1993 deaths
Major League Baseball outfielders
Brooklyn Dodgers players
Baseball players from Texas
North Texas Mean Green baseball players
People from Springtown, Texas
Vicksburg Hill Billies players
Montgomery Lions players
Jackson Senators players
Memphis Chickasaws players
St. Paul Saints (AA) players
Atlanta Crackers players
Tulsa Oilers (baseball) players
New Orleans Pelicans (baseball) players